Hylaeus graenicheri is a species of hymenopteran in the family Colletidae. It is found in North America. The species is one of five in the family Colletidae that are endemic to Florida, and is only found in the southern portion of the state.

References

Further reading

 

Colletidae
Articles created by Qbugbot
Insects described in 1951
Endemic fauna of Florida